Ramon "Ricky" Arellano Carandang (born September 2, 1967) is a Filipino journalist. He was a news correspondent and anchor for ABS-CBN and ANC until July 9, 2010, when he resigned to serve as Presidential Communications Development and Strategic Planning Office Secretary under the Presidential Communications Group during the Presidency of Benigno Aquino III. He is currently the Vice President and Head of the Integrated Corporate Communications of First Philippine Holdings Corporation, First Gen Corporation and Energy Development Corporation.

Early life and career
Ricky Carandang was born on September 2, 1967, in Manila, Philippines. He is the son of former St. Luke's College of Medicine President and Dean Dr. Brigido Carandang, Jr. and clinical psychologist and MLAC Institute for Children and Families Founder and President Dra. Maria Lourdes A. Carandang.

He spent his early years in Sacramento, California entering elementary in Isadore Cohen Elementary School. He returned to the Philippines and finished high school and college at the Ateneo de Manila University with a Bachelor of Arts in Management Economics in 1989.

He spent the whole of the 1990s in the business sector, as a stockbroker for Pryce Securities, HG Asia Securities, and Kim Eng Securities.

Media
Before venturing into public service, Carandang he is the first radio anchor of DZAR Angel Radyo in 1993. While in 2000, Carandang was a top news anchor for the ABS-CBN News Channel (ANC). He co-hosted the evening news show The Rundown, hosted the national affairs talk show The Big Picture, and was a field reporter for ABS-CBN's Filipino-language free-television news programs TV Patrol and Bandila.

Public Service
Secretary Carandang is the first head of the Presidential Communications Development and Strategic Planning Office (PCDSPO), created in 2010 at the beginning of President Benigno S. Aquino III’s term. PCDSPO serves as the President’s chief message-crafting body. He resigned on December 12, 2013 effective by the end of the year.

Awards/ Distinctions 
He was proclaimed “Broadcaster of the Year” by the Rotary Club of Manila in 2010, the culmination of a career in broadcast journalism that spans the years 1976 to 2010. He was also President and Business Editor of Newsbreak Magazine from 2000 to 2004.

References

External links
 

Filipino television news anchors
Living people
Members of the Presidential Communications Group of the Philippines
1967 births
People from Makati
Ateneo de Manila University alumni
Benigno Aquino III administration cabinet members
ABS-CBN News and Current Affairs people